Christopher John Lewis (7 September 1964 – 23 September 1997) was a New Zealand criminal who made an unsuccessful attempt to assassinate Queen Elizabeth II in 1981. He planned later attempts at assassinating other British royal family members but was kept away from them by the authorities in New Zealand.

In 1997, he was charged with the murder of Tania Furlan and the kidnapping of her daughter, though a friend was found to be responsible. He died by suicide before he could be brought to trial.

Early life 
Lewis was born in Dunedin on 7 September 1964. He had a troubled life; his father was a cruel disciplinarian, and he was expelled from school after assaulting another child. He struggled at school and was unable to write or read until the age of eight. As a boy, he idolised Charles Manson. In his teens, he formed a would-be guerrilla army (the National Imperial Gurelia Army) with two friends.  The group stole weapons, sent a threatening letter to the police, and robbed a post office of $5,244.

Assassination attempts 
On 14 October 1981, 17-year-old Lewis had been tracking the New Zealand tour of the royal family, who were to visit Otago Museum in Dunedin. Lewis concealed a .22 (5.6 mm) calibre rifle wrapped up in an old pair of jeans, and traveled by bicycle to the Adams Building, where he took up a position in a toilet cubicle. He fired through the window at the Queen as she was exiting a car. The shot did not impact near the Queen or anyone else, but a loud crack was heard; local police told journalists that the noise had been caused by a sign falling down.

While Lewis did not have a proper vantage point nor a sufficiently powerful rifle for his purposes, a 1997 report by the New Zealand Security Intelligence Service notes that his intent was to kill the Queen. Eight days after firing the shot, Lewis was arrested and charged with public possession of a firearm, and public discharging of a firearm. As the charges were read to him, Lewis responded, "Only two charges, what? Shit ... Had the bullet hit her, would it be treason?" Lewis served three years in prison, with the last part in a psychiatric prison.

The New Zealand Police covered up the story, charging him with possession of a firearm, but kept the event under wraps as they were concerned that it would create a negative image of New Zealand and endanger future royal visits. According to police files, Lewis was being asked about an unrelated robbery, when he took police to the position where he had fired at the Queen and showed police the empty casings and the rifle. The facts of the attempt were classified, until released in February 2018 in response to a request from Fairfax Media.

Lewis unsuccessfully attempted to escape from a psychiatric ward in 1983, when the Prince and Princess of Wales, Charles and Diana, toured New Zealand with their son William.

Later life 
Lewis was eventually released, and when a third royal visit occurred the government sent him to Great Barrier Island to keep him away from the royal family. He was later charged with the 1997 hammer murder of a young mother, Tania Furlan, and the kidnapping of her child. He electrocuted himself in Mount Eden Prison, Auckland, while awaiting trial. A friend of Lewis, Travis Burns, who had implicated him in the Furlan crimes and received a reward for doing so, later confessed to the murder.

See also 
Marcus Sarjeant, man who fired six blank rounds at the Queen in June 1981
David Kang, man who fired two shots at Prince Charles in 1994

References 

1964 births
1997 suicides
People who committed suicide in prison custody
Suicides by electrocution
Failed regicides
20th-century New Zealand criminals
People from Dunedin
Suicides in New Zealand
Failed assassins
1981 crimes in New Zealand
1981 in New Zealand
People charged with murder
People charged with kidnapping
New Zealand people who died in prison custody
Prisoners who died in New Zealand detention
1997 murders in New Zealand